Nikos Filippidis was a Greek rower. He competed in the men's coxed four event at the 1948 Summer Olympics.

References

External links
  

Year of birth missing
Possibly living people
Greek male rowers
Olympic rowers of Greece
Rowers at the 1948 Summer Olympics
Place of birth missing